"Heaven's Kitchen" was Bonnie Pink's second album released under the Pony Canyon label on May 16, 1997.　This album was produced by Tore Johansson following the single Do You Crash?.

Track listing

Charts

Album

Singles

1997 albums
Bonnie Pink albums
Pony Canyon albums
Albums produced by Tore Johansson